Beregovoy is a rural locality (a settlement) in Srednevolzhsky Selsoviet of Yenotayevsky District, Astrakhan Oblast, Russia. The population was 105 as of 2010. There are 2 streets.

Geography 
Beregovoy is located 66 km southeast of Yenotayevka (the district's administrative centre) by road. Iki-Chibirsky is the nearest rural locality.

References 

Rural localities in Yenotayevsky District